Youse's Maryland Orioles are a collegiate summer baseball team based in Linthicum, Maryland. Most of its players are drawn from the college ranks.  The team is a member of the Cal Ripken Collegiate Baseball League (CRSCBL). The Maryland Orioles play their weekday home games at Bachman Park and weekend games at Calvert Hall High School. Since its founding in 1952, the team has sent at least 48 players to the Major Leagues, including Hall of Famers Al Kaline and Reggie Jackson.

History

Youse's Maryland Orioles were founded in 1952 by the Leone Family of Baltimore Maryland.  Although the team has changed name and management on several occasions since then, it has been in continuous operation.  The team currently competes in both the Cal Ripken Collegiate Baseball League and the All America Amateur Baseball Association ("AAABA").

Named for Walter Youse, who served as head coach from 1957 to his death in 2005, the team is sometimes called the "Orioles Scouting Team.  The team has won the AAABA Championship 26 times. The team joined the CRSCBL as a founding team in 2005 and has tied for the season championship of that league once, in 2007.  In 2008 the Orioles won the 2008 regular season with a record of 34–7 and won the post-season tournament.  In 2008 the team also won its 26th AAABA title, and its sixth consecutive AAABA title.

Championships

All-American Amateur Baseball Association
2008
2007
2006
2005
2004
2003

Cal Ripken Collegiate Baseball League
2010 Regular Season Champions 2nd team eliminated out of 4 in playoffs
2008 Regular Season and Tournament Champions
2007 (Tied with the Rockville Express)

Notable alumni
 Steve Clevenger
 Gavin Floyd
 Reggie Jackson
 Todd Jones
 Al Kaline
 John Mabry

References

Tom Phebas
John Miller
Dave Boswell
Jim Spencer
Barry Setrone
Charlie Sands
Willie Akiens

External links
Cal Ripken Collegiate Baseball League official website
All American Amateur Baseball Association Official Website

Linthicum, Maryland
Amateur baseball teams in Maryland
1952 establishments in Maryland
Baseball teams established in 1952